Lewis Kamas (October 24, 1921 – October 26, 1996) was an American politician. He served as a Republican member for the 58th district of the Oklahoma House of Representatives.

Life and career 
Kamas was born in Beaver County, Oklahoma. He attended Northwestern Oklahoma State University.

In 1967, Kamas was elected to represent the 58th district of the Oklahoma House of Representatives, succeeding A. L. Murrow. He served until 1988.

Kamas died in October 1996, at the age of 75.

References 

1921 births
1996 deaths
20th-century Members of the Oklahoma House of Representatives
Northwestern Oklahoma State University alumni
People from Beaver County, Oklahoma
Republican Party members of the Oklahoma House of Representatives